Valeriu Ionuţ Bordeanu (born 2 February 1977) is a Romanian football coach and a former player who played as a left back. He is an assistant coach at CFR Cluj. His father Ioan and brother Alin were also footballers, both of them being goalkeepers.

Bordeanu played for a lot of Liga I teams like Ceahlăul Piatra Neamț, Politehnica Iași, Steaua București, Rapid București, Universitatea Craiova or Dinamo București. He also played a short period in Russia, at Kuban Krasnodar. He is well known for his aggressive play.

Personal life
His father Ioan and brother Alin were also footballers, both of them being goalkeepers.

Honours
Steaua București
Liga I: 2000–01
Rapid București
Supercupa României: 2003
Unirea Urziceni
Liga I: 2008–09
FC Botoșani
Liga II: 2012–13

References

External links

Valeriu Bordeanu at Footballdatabase

Living people
1977 births
Sportspeople from Botoșani
Romanian footballers
Association football fullbacks
CSM Suceava players
FC Steaua București players
FC Kuban Krasnodar players
FC Unirea Urziceni players
FC U Craiova 1948 players
FC Politehnica Iași (1945) players
FC Rapid București players
FCM Bacău players
CSM Ceahlăul Piatra Neamț players
FC Dinamo București players
FC Botoșani players
Liga I players
Liga II
Russian Premier League players
Romanian expatriate footballers
Expatriate footballers in Russia
FC Botoșani managers
Romanian expatriate sportspeople in Russia